Charles Wallace Adair, Jr. (26 January 1914 in Xenia, Ohio – 22 January 2006 in Falls Church, Virginia) was a career United States Foreign Service Officer, serving as Ambassador to Panama (1965-1969) and Ambassador to Uruguay (1969-1972).

Early life
Adair graduated from the University of Wisconsin, and worked for Chase Bank in Panama before joining the State Department.

Foreign service career
Adair was posted to various economic positions in US missions around Europe, particularly the American Embassy in Paris, France. Ambassador Adair also served as the US Vice-Consul in Bombay, India, in 1943. In 1961, he was also appointed deputy secretary general of the Organisation for European Economic Co-operation in Paris.

He was appointed Ambassador Extraordinary and Plenipotentiary of the United States to Panama on 6 May 1965, presenting his credentials to President Marco Aurelio Robles Méndez on 13 May 1965. Adair assumed the ambassadorship during a period of difficult United States–Panama relations. In 1966, Panamanian student demonstrators struck Adair in the back with a milk carton filled with red paint. During his ambassadorship, Adair worked to rebuild relations and initiated talks that culminated in the Torrijos–Carter Treaties.  He left the post on 6 September 1969.  He was appointed Ambassador Extraordinary and Plenipotentiary to Uruguay on 15 September 1969, presented his credentials on 13 November 1969 and left the post on 28 September 1972. He retired from the Foreign Service in 1972.

Adair lived in Stuart, Florida, from his retirement until 1996, when he moved to Virginia. He died January 22, 2006, in Falls Church, Virginia, aged 91.

References

External links
Birth details
State Department Principal Officers of the Department and U.S. Chiefs of Mission
 

1914 births
2006 deaths
People from Xenia, Ohio
Ambassadors of the United States to Panama
Ambassadors of the United States to Uruguay
United States Foreign Service personnel